Barlos is a Greek surname. Notable people with the surname include:

Loukas Barlos (1920–1999), Greek businessman
Nikos Barlos (born 1979), Greek basketball player and coach

Greek-language surnames